Sebastián Reyes (born 12 March 1997) is a Bolivian professional footballer who plays as a defender for Bolívar in the Bolivian Primera División. On 20 November 2018 Reyes made his debut for the Bolivia national football team against Iraq.

Titles
  Wilstermann 2015/16 (Torneo Clausura Bolivian Primera División)
  Wilstermann 2018 (Torneo Apertura Bolivian Primera División)
  Wilstermann 2019 (Torneo Clausura Bolivian Primera División)

References

External links
 
 

1997 births
Living people
Bolivian footballers
Bolivia international footballers
Bolivia under-20 international footballers
Association football defenders
Club Petrolero players
C.D. Jorge Wilstermann players
Bolivian Primera División players
Sportspeople from Cochabamba